A hot-tube ignitor was an early device that fit onto the cylinder head of an internal-combustion engine, used to ignite the compressed fuel/air mixture by means of a flame heating part of the tube red-hot. A hot-tube ignitor consisted of a metal or porcelain tube, closed at one end and attached to the cylinder head at the other and an adjustable burner that could be moved to position its flame at any point along the length of the tube.

Operation
The compression stroke in the cylinder pushed some left over combustion products in the tube, followed by fresh (unburned) fuel/air mixture. When the compression was enough that the fuel reached the red-hot area of the tube, ignition occurred. On early designs, ignition timing was adjusted by adjusting the position of the red-hot spot on the tube—this was accomplished by moving the burner along the length of the tube. Most later styles used a fixed burner and varied tube lengths to change ignition timing.

Disadvantages
Hot-tube ignitors had many problems, most caused by the sudden pressure changes in the tube because of the operation of the engine and the high temperature of the tube. It was extremely difficult to find materials that were both durable enough for these conditions and inexpensive. 

Also important was never setting the burner flame where it would heat the tube white hot, which would rapidly damage the tube and could cause it to burst explosively. This mistake was made often.

The tubes used were typically 6 to 12 inches long, which tended to make them impractical for use on anything but large engines (e.g., stationary motors in factories). Tubes rarely lasted longer than a year before needing replacement, especially when the engines were fueled with high sulfur gases like unpurified producer gas or natural gas.

See also
 Hot bulb engine
 Hot tube engine

References

Ignition systems